Malaya Gorka is a rural locality (a village) in Gorodishchenskoye Rural Settlement, Nyuksensky District, Vologda Oblast, Russia. The population was 57 as of 2002.

Geography 
Malaya Gorka is located 56 km southwest of Nyuksenitsa (the district's administrative centre) by road. Slekishino is the nearest rural locality.

References 

Rural localities in Nyuksensky District